Kentigern, known as Mungo, was a missionary in the Brittonic Kingdom of Strathclyde in the late sixth century, and the founder and patron saint of the city of Glasgow.

Name
In Wales and England, this saint is known by his birth and baptismal name Kentigern. The evidence is based on the Old Welsh record . Other etymologies have been suggested, including British  'chief prince' based on the English form Kentigern, but the Old Welsh form above and Old English  do not appear to support this.

Particularly in Scotland, he is known by the pet name Mungo, possibly derived from the Cumbric equivalent of the  'my dear (one)'. An ancient church in Bromfield, Cumbria, is named after him, as are Crosthwaite Parish Church and some other churches in the northern part of Cumbria, for example St Mungo's Church, Dearham.

Biographers
The Life of Saint Mungo was written by the monastic hagiographer Jocelyn of Furness in about 1185. Jocelyn states that he rewrote the 'life' from an earlier Glasgow legend and an Old Irish document. There are certainly two other medieval lives: the earlier partial life in the Cottonian manuscript now in the British Library, and the later Life, based on Jocelyn, by John of Tynemouth.

Life

Mungo's mother Teneu was a princess, the daughter of King Lleuddun (Latin: Leudonus) who ruled a territory around what is now Lothian in Scotland, perhaps the kingdom of Gododdin in the Old North. She became pregnant after being raped by Owain mab Urien according to the British Library manuscript. However, other historic accounts claim Owain and Teneu (also known as Thaney) had a love affair whilst he was still married to his wife Penarwen and that her father, King Lot, separated the pair after she became pregnant. Later, allegedly, after Penarwen died, Tenue/Thaney returned to King Owain and the pair were able to marry before King Owain met his death battling Bernicia in 597 AD.

Her furious father had her thrown from the heights of Traprain Law. Surviving, she was then abandoned in a coracle in which she drifted across the Firth of Forth to Culross in Fife. There Mungo was born.

Mungo was brought up by Saint Serf who was ministering to the Picts in that area. It was Serf who gave him his popular pet-name. At the age of twenty-five, Mungo began his missionary labours on the Clyde, on the site of modern Glasgow. He built his church across the water from an extinct volcano, next to the Molendinar Burn, where the present medieval cathedral now stands. For some thirteen years, he laboured in the district, living a most austere life in a small cell and making many converts by his holy example and his preaching.

A strong anti-Christian movement in Strathclyde, headed by a certain King Morken, compelled Mungo to leave the district, and he retired to Wales, via Cumbria, staying for a time with Saint David at St David's, and afterwards moving on to Gwynedd where he founded a cathedral at Llanelwy (St Asaph in English). While there, he undertook a pilgrimage to Rome. However, the new King of Strathclyde, Riderch Hael, invited Mungo to return to his kingdom. He decided to go and appointed Saint Asaph/Asaff as Bishop of Llanelwy in his place.

For some years, Mungo fixed his Episcopal seat at Hoddom in Dumfriesshire, evangelising thence the district of Galloway. He eventually returned to Glasgow where a large community grew up around him. It was nearby, in Kilmacolm, that he was visited by Saint Columba, who was at that time labouring in Strathtay. The two saints embraced, held long converse, and exchanged their pastoral staves. In old age, Mungo became very feeble and his chin had to be set in place with a bandage. He is said to have died in his bath, on Sunday 13 January.

Miracles
In the Life of Saint Mungo, he performed four miracles in Glasgow. The following verse is used to remember Mungo's four miracles:
Here is the bird that never flew
Here is the tree that never grew
Here is the bell that never rang
Here is the fish that never swam
The verses refer to the following:
 The Bird: Mungo restored life to a robin that had been killed by some of his classmates.
 The Tree: Mungo had been left in charge of a fire in Saint Serf's monastery. He fell asleep and the fire went out. Taking a hazel branch, he restarted the fire.
 The Bell: the bell is thought to have been brought by Mungo from Rome. It was said to have been used in services and to mourn the dead. The original bell no longer exists, and a replacement, created in the 1640s, is now on display in Glasgow.
 The Fish: refers to the story about Queen Languoreth of Strathclyde who was suspected of infidelity by her husband. King Riderch demanded to see her ring, which he claimed she had given to her lover. In reality the King had thrown it into the River Clyde. Faced with execution she appealed for help to Mungo, who ordered a messenger to catch a fish in the river. On opening the fish, the ring was miraculously found inside, which allowed the Queen to clear her name. (This story may be confused with an almost identical one concerning King Maelgwn of Gwynedd and Saint Asaph.)

Analysis
Mungo's ancestry is recorded in the Bonedd y Saint. His father, Owain was a King of Rheged. His maternal grandfather, Lleuddun, was probably a King of the Gododdin; Lothian was named after him. There seems little reason to doubt that Mungo was one of the first evangelists of Strathclyde, under the patronage of King Rhiderch Hael, and probably became the first Bishop of Glasgow.

Jocelin seems to have altered parts of the original life that he did not understand; while adding others, like the trip to Rome, that served his own purposes, largely the promotion of the Bishopric of Glasgow. Some new parts may have been collected from genuine local stories, particularly those of Mungo's work in Cumbria. S. Mundahl-Harris has shown that Mungo's associations with St Asaph were a Norman invention. However, in Scotland, excavations at Hoddom have brought confirmation of early Christian activity there, uncovering a late 6th-century stone baptistery.

Details of Mungo's infirmity have a ring of authenticity about them. The year of Mungo's death is sometimes given as 603, but is recorded in the Annales Cambriae as 612. 13 January was a Sunday in both 603 and 614. David McRoberts has argued that his death in the bath is a garbled version of his collapse during a baptismal service.

In a late 15th-century fragmentary manuscript generally called 'Lailoken and Kentigern', Mungo appears in conflict with the mad prophet, Lailoken alias Merlin. Lailoken's appearance at the Battle of Arfderydd in 573 has led to a connection being made between this battle, the rise of Riderch Hael and the return of Mungo to Strathclyde.

The Life of Saint Mungo bears similarities with Chrétien de Troyes's French romance Yvain, the Knight of the Lion. In Chrétien's story, Yvain, a version of Owain mab Urien, courts and marries Laudine, only to leave her for a period to go adventuring. This suggests that the works share a common source.

Veneration

On the spot where Mungo was buried now stands the cathedral dedicated in his honour. His shrine was a great centre of Christian pilgrimage until the Scottish Reformation. His remains are said to still rest in the crypt. A spring called "St. Mungo's Well"
fell eastwards from the apse.

His festival was kept throughout Scotland on 13 January. The Bollandists have printed a special mass for this feast, dating from the 13th century. His feast day in the West is 13 January. His feast day in the Eastern Orthodox Church is 14 January.

Mungo's four religious miracles in Glasgow are represented in the city's coat of arms. Glasgow's current motto Let Glasgow flourish by the preaching of His word and the praising of His name and the more secular Let Glasgow flourish, are both inspired by Mungo's original call "Let Glasgow flourish by the preaching of the word".

Saint Mungo's Well was a cold water spring and bath at Copgrove, near Ripon, North Yorkshire, formerly believed effective for treating rickets.

Glasgow Fire Brigade also named their fireboat St. Mungo, which served the around the Clyde from 1959 to 1975.

One of Arthur H. Peppercorn's A1 Pacific locomotives (ordered by the LNER but not built until after nationalisation of Britain's railways) was named Saint Mungo, entering service in 1949 and carrying the BR number 60145. This was the last of the design to be withdrawn in 1966.

Mungo is remembered in the Church of England with a commemoration on 13 January.

Namesake churches, schools and charities

Saint Mungo founded a number of churches during his period as Archbishop of Strathclyde of which Stobo Kirk is a notable example. At Townhead and Dennistoun in Glasgow there is a modern Roman Catholic church and a traditional Scottish Episcopal Church respectively dedicated to the saint.

St Mungo's Academy is a Roman Catholic, co-educational, comprehensive, secondary school located in Bridgeton, Glasgow.

Another church established by the saint himself was St Kentigern's Church of Lanark, founded shortly before his death, and which now stands in ruins. Another church called St Kentigern's was built in the town in the late 19th century. It is still present but has been converted to housing and office space.

In Kilmarnock, a Church of Scotland congregation is named St Kentigern's.

St. Kentigern's Academy opened in Blackburn, West Lothian in September 1974.

In Alloa, a chapel dedicated to St. Mungo is thought to have been erected during the fourteenth or fifteenth-century. The present Church of Scotland St. Mungo's Parish Church in Alloa was built in 1817.

In Cumbernauld, there is St. Mungo's Parish Church in the centre of the New Town.

In the Lake District village of Caldbeck there is a church and a well named after him. The Cumbrian parish churches at Crossthwaite in Keswick, Mungrisdale, Castle Sowerby, and Irthington are also dedicated to St Kentigern. There are two Cumbrian churches dedicated to St Mungo, one at Bromfield (also a well and castle) and one at Dearham.

There is a St Kentigern's school and church in Blackpool.

In Falkirk, there is a St. Mungo's High School.

In Grinsdale, Cumbria there is a church venerated to St. Kentigern.

Also in Cumbria, there are two Greek Orthodox Communities venerated to St. Mungo/Kentigern, one in Dalton-in-Furness and the other in Keswick.

In Fallowfield, a suburb of the city of Manchester, a Roman Catholic church is dedicated to Saint Kentigern.

St Kentigern's is a small Roman Catholic Church in the village of Eyeries, on the Beara peninsula in West Cork, Ireland.

Mungo or Kentigern is the patron of a Presbyterian church school in Auckland, New Zealand, which has three campuses: Saint Kentigern College, a secondary co-ed college in the suburb of Pakuranga, Saint Kentigern Boys School, a boys-only private junior primary school in the suburb of Remuera, and Saint Kentigern Girls School, a girls-only private junior primary school also in Remuera.

There is a United Church of Canada charge in Cushing Quebec Canada, Saint Mungo's United Church. Built in the 1836 originally as a Church of Scotland, it has recently been restored for its 180th anniversary.

Although secular, the English charity for the support and empowerment of the homeless, St. Mungo's, was named after the saint by its founder. The Glasgow-born Harry Stone named it in honour of the patron saint of his birth city when the charity was established in 1969. Saint Mungo's runs hostels, outreach, emergency shelters, and employment and training services. It provides an online and in-person "Recovery College" free to its students.

Fiction
St. Mungo is mentioned in the Father Brown series of books by G. K. Chesterton, as the titular saint of Father Brown's parish.

St. Mungo's Hospital for Magical Maladies and Injuries is the primary hospital of Magical Britain in the Harry Potter series of books by J. K. Rowling.

Kentigern Gardens is the location of a murder in The Cuckoo's Calling, a novel published under J. K. Rowling's pseudonym of Robert Galbraith.

Mungo is the main antagonist in the historical novel The Lost Queen by Signe Pike.

See also
St Kentigern's Church - dedicated churches
 Saint Mungo, patron saint archive

Notes

Sources and references
 The Magnificent Gael [Reginald B. Hale] 1976, World Media Productions* Baring-Gould, Sabine & Fisher, John (1907: 2000) Lives of the British Saints. 8 vols. Felinfach: Llanerch (Facsim. reprint in 8 parts of the 4 vol. ed. published: London: Honourable Society of Cymmrodorion, 1907–1913.)
 Chrétien de Troyes; Burton Raffel, ed. (1987) Yvain, the Knight of the Lion. New Haven: Yale University Press.
 Davies, John Reuben, "Bishop Kentigern among the Britons," in Boardman, Steve, John Reuben Davies, Eila Williamson (eds), Saints' Cults in the Celtic World (Woodbridge, Boydell Press, 2009) (Studies in Celtic History),
 Delaney, John J. (1983) Pocket Dictionary of Saints. Image Books.
 Lowe, Chris (1999) Angels, Fools and Tyrants. Edinburgh: Canongate Books & Historic Scotland
 Rees, Elizabeth (2000) Celtic Saints: passionate wanderers. London: Thames & Hudson
 "St. Kentigern". "The Catholic Encyclopedia". New Advent. 
 Tranter, Nigel (1993) Druid Sacrifice. London: Hodder & Stoughton (historical novel)
 Wade-Evans, A. W. (1934) Welsh Christian Origins. Oxford: Alden Press
 McArthur Irvin, Lindsay, "Building a British Identity: Jocelin of Furness's Use of Sources in Vita Kentigerni," in Identity and Alterity in Hagiography and the Cult ofSaints, eds. Ana Marinkovic and Trpimir Vedris (Zagreb: Hagiotheca, 2010), 103–117

External links

 Jocelyn's Life of Saint Mungo
Glasgow Museums: St Mungo Museum of Religious Life and Art
Kentigern and Gonothigernus (Heroic Age Online Journal) 
St Mungo's Holy Well, Alloway, Ayrshire

614 deaths
7th-century Christian saints
Bishops of Glasgow
Bishops of St Asaph
City founders
History of Glasgow
Medieval Scottish saints
Northern Brythonic saints
People from Glasgow
Year of birth unknown
People from Culross
Anglican saints
518 births